Guillermo Newberry (born 9 May 1898, date of death unknown) was an Argentine sprinter. He competed in the men's 4 × 100 metres relay at the 1924 Summer Olympics.

References

External links
 

1898 births
Year of death missing
Athletes (track and field) at the 1924 Summer Olympics
Argentine male sprinters
Argentine male hurdlers
Olympic athletes of Argentina
Place of birth missing